Gian Luigi Rondi (10 December 1921 – 22 September 2016) was an Italian film critic. He was a member of the jury at the 12th and 15th Moscow International Film Festival. He was also a member of the jury at the 11th and 32nd Berlin International Film Festival. He was also a member of the jury three times at the Cannes Film Festival in 1963, 1967 and 1980. He was the president of the jury at the 48th Venice Film Festival. A closeted homosexual for most of his life, he was married with Yvette Spadaccini from 1948 to her death in 2012.

Selected filmography
 Obsession (1954)

References

External links

1921 births
2016 deaths
Italian film critics